The 122nd Fighter Wing (122 FW sometimes 122nd) is a unit of the Indiana Air National Guard, stationed at Fort Wayne Air National Guard Station, Fort Wayne, Indiana. If activated to federal service, the wing is gained by the United States Air Force Air Combat Command.

Units
 122nd Operations Group (Tail code formerly "FW," now "IN.")
 163rd Fighter Squadron
 122nd Maintenance Group
 122nd Mission Support Group
 122nd Medical Group

History

The 358th Fighter Group trained in the Mid-Atlantic United States with P-40 Warhawks, 1943. While in training also used for air defense of Philadelphia area. Moved to England during September and October 1943, they were equipped with P-47 Thunderbolts and began operations on 20 December 1943 and served in combat with Eighth and later, Ninth Air Forces until V-E Day.

In 2005 the wing introduced the reconnaissance Theater Airborne Reconnaissance System, becoming one of the first units to fly with it.

In 2008, after having flown for 17 years with the block 25 aircraft, these F-16s were nearing the end of their planned operational lifespans. The aircraft the 122nd received were only somewhat newer; Block 30 F-16C/Ds, manufactured between 1987 and 1989. These models were provided by the Michigan Air National Guard 107th Fighter Squadron, which was then transitioning to the A-10 Thunderbolt II at the time. With the upgrade to the Block 30 aircraft, the tail code of the 163rd was changed from "FW" (Fort Wayne) to "IN" (Indiana) in 2009 when the 181st Fighter Wing at Hulman Field became a non-flying unit. However, only a few of the F-16s were re-coded.

In 2009 – the year the unit honored its predecessor unit – the 358th FG – with a heritage jet – it was decided that the squadron was to retire their 20-year-old F-16s and become an A-10 Thunderbolt II squadron. The conversion happened in 2010.

Lineage

 Constituted as 358th Fighter Group on 20 December 1942
 Activated on 1 January 1943
 Inactivated on 7 November 1945
 Re-designated: 122nd Fighter Group and allocated to Indiana ANG on 24 May 1946
 Extended federal recognition on 9 December 1946
 Federalized and ordered to active service on: 10 February 1951
 Established as 122nd Fighter-Interceptor Wing, extended federal recognition and activated on 10 February 1951
 Group re-designated as 122nd Fighter-Interceptor Group and assigned as subordinate unit
 Inactivated on 7 February 1952
 Released from active duty and returned to Indiana state control, 1 November 1952
 Re-activated on 1 November 1952
 Re-designated: 122nd Tactical Fighter Wing, 1 July 1954
 Group re-designated 122nd Tactical Fighter Group
 Re-designated: 122nd Tactical Fighter Wing (Special Delivery), 1 July 1959
 Group re-designated 122nd Tactical Fighter Group (Special Delivery)
 Federalized and ordered to active service on: 1 October 1961
 Operated as: 7122nd Tactical Wing (Special Delivery), 1 October 1961 – 31 August 1962
 Released from active duty and returned to Indiana state control, 31 August 1962
 122nd Tactical Fighter Group inactivated 30 June 1974.
 Re-designated: 122nd Fighter Wing, 16 March 1992 – present
 Group re-activated and re-designated 122nd Operations Group

Assignments
 I Fighter Command, 1 January–September 1943
 Attached to: Philadelphia Fighter Wing, 28 April–September 1943
 IX Fighter Command
 Attached to: VIII Fighter Command, 20 October 1943
 71st Fighter Wing
 Attached to: IX Tactical Air Command, 1 August 1944
 70th Fighter Wing
 Attached to: IX Tactical Air Command, 1 October 1944
 XIX Tactical Air Command, 16 January–July 1945
 Second Air Force, 3 August – 7 November 1945
 66th Fighter Wing, 9 December 1946
 55th Fighter Wing, 7 December 1947
 Indiana Air National Guard, 31 October 1950
 Gained by: Tenth Air Force, Continental Air Command
 Eastern Air Defense Force, Air Defense Command, 10 February 1951
 Central Air Defense Force, Air Defense Command, 1 December 1951 – 7 February 1952
 Indiana Air National Guard, 1 November 1952
 Gained by: Eastern Air Defense Force, Air Defense Command
 Gained by: Tactical Air Command, 1 July 1954
 Ninth Air Force, 1 October 1961
 Attached to Seventeenth Air Force, 1 October 1961 – 31 August 1962
 Indiana Air National Guard, 1 September 1962
 Gained by: Tactical Air Command
 Gained by: Air Combat Command, 1 June 1992 – present

Components
 122nd Fighter-Interceptor (later Tactical Fighter) Group, 10 February 1951 – 30 June 1974
 Re-designated: 163rd Operations Group, 16 March 1992 – present

 112th Fighter (later Fighter-Interceptor, Tactical Fighter) Squadron, 9 December 1946 – 30 September 1962 (Ohio ANG)
 113th Fighter (later Fighter-Interceptor, Tactical Fighter) Squadron, 9 December 1946 – 30 September 1962 (GSU at Terre Haute, IN)
 163rd Fighter (later Fighter-Interceptor, Tactical Fighter, Fighter) Squadron, 9 December 1946 – Present
 365th Fighter Squadron: 1 January 1943 – 7 November 1945
 366th Fighter Squadron: 1 January 1943 – 7 November 1945
 367th Fighter Squadron: 1 January 1943 – 7 November 1945

Stations

 Richmond Army Air Base, Virginia, 1 January 1943
 Baltimore Municipal Airport, Maryland, 28 April 1943
 Camp Springs AAF, Maryland, 28 May 1943
 Philadelphia Airport, Pennsylvania, 16 June 1943
 Richmond Army Air Base, Virginia, 13 August – 25 September—1943
 RAF Goxhill (AAF-345), England, 20 October 1943
 RAF Leiston (AAF-373), England, 29 November 1943
 RAF Raydon (AAF-157), England, 31 January 1944
 RAF High Halden (AAF-411), England, 13 April 1944
 Cretteville Airfield (A-14), France, 3 July 1944

 Pontorson Airfield (A-28), France, 14 August 1944
 Vitry Airfield (A-67), France, 14 September 1944
 Mourmelon-le-Grand Airfield (A-80), France, 16 October 1944
 Toul-Croix De Metz Airfield (A-90), France, 9 November 1944
 Mannheim/Sandhofen Airfield (Y-79), Germany, 2 April 1945
 Reims/Champagne Airfield, France, c. 23 June–July 1945
 La Junta Army Air Field, Colorado, 3 August – 7 November 1945
 Stout Field, Indianapolis, Indiana, 9 December 1946
 Baer Field, Fort Wayne, Indiana, 1 May 1951
 Designated: Fort Wayne Air National Guard Station, 1991 – present

Aircraft

 P-40 Warhawk, 1943
 P-47D/N Thunderbolt, 1943–1945
 F-51D Mustang, 1946–1951
 F-51H Mustang, 1951–1954
 F-80C Shooting Star, 1954–1956
 F-86A Sabre, 1956–1958
 F-84F Thunderstreak, 1958–1962; 1964–1971

 RF-84F Thunderstreak, 1962–1964
 F-100D/F Super Sabre, 1971–1979
 F-4C Phantom II, 1979–1986
 F-4E Phantom II, 1986–1991
 F-16C/D Fighting Falcon, 1991–2010
 A-10 Thunderbolt II, 2010 – present

References

 Maurer, Maurer (1983). Air Force Combat Units of World War II. Maxwell AFB, Alabama: Office of Air Force History. .
 Johnson, David C. (1988), U.S. Army Air Forces Continental Airfields (ETO), D-Day to V-E Day; Research Division, USAF Historical Research Center, Maxwell AFB, Alabama.
 Rogers, B. (2006). United States Air Force Unit Designations Since 1978. 
 McLaren, David. Republic F-84 Thunderjet, Thunderstreak & Thunderflash: A Photo Chronicle. Atglen, PA: Schiffer Military/Aviation History, 1998. .

External links
 Cornett, Lloyd H. and Johnson, Mildred W., A Handbook of Aerospace Defense Organization  1946–1980, Office of History, Aerospace Defense Center, Peterson AFB, CO (1980).
 163rd Fighter Squadron @ F-16.net
 https://www.usnews.com/news/best-states/indiana/articles/2018-03-05/new-commander-named-for-air-national-guards-fort-wayne-base

Wings of the United States Air National Guard
Military in units based in Indiana
122
Military units and formations established in 1950